Prithvi Bir Bikram Shah (18 August 1875 – 11 December 1911) was King of Nepal from 1881 until 1911. Among the most notable events of his reign were the introduction of the first automobiles to Nepal, and the creation of strict water and sanitation systems for much of the country.
King Prithvi's eldest child was Princess Royal Lakshmi Rajya Lakshmi Devi, who was married to Field Marshal Kaiser Shamsher Jang Bahadur Rana. She was made the Crown Princess and was heir to Nepal's throne until she was in her late teens, when her brother King Tribhuvan Bir Bikram Shah Dev was born. Until then King Prithvi only had four daughters and four from another wife.

While King Prithivi was kept as a glorified prisoner and ceremonial monarch at Narayanhiti Royal Palace, his Sahebjyu brothers, who were his closest allies and confidants were exiled to Palaces across Nepal including in Palpa, Birgunj and Dhankuta from Hanuman Dhoka Royal Palace, Basantapur, to prevent any repeated attempts at regaining royal prerogatives. The royal Sahebjyus continued to lead honourable lives with full state benefits, controlled their various areas as dukedoms and often travelled to the court in Kathmandu to meet the King. However, due to some of their increasing influence in State matters, fears of a coup arose and thus, movement restrictions imposed on the family became much more severe following the end of Prime Minister Bir Sumsher's rule with Chandra Sumsher on the Prime Ministerial throne, especially in relation to getting an audience with their half brother King PrithiviBir at Narayanhiti Royal Palace, Kathmandu. 

Much like his father, King PrithiviBir died under suspicious circumstances at a relatively young age, and his son Tribhuvan ascended the throne.

Honours
  Sovereign of the Order of Gorkha Dakshina Bahu (1896).

Ancestry

References 

|-

Prithvi Bir Bikram Shah
Prithvi Bir Bikram Shah
Prithvi Bir
Nepalese Hindus
Child monarchs from Asia
Kingdom of Nepal
Shah dynasty
Hindu monarchs